Vidiri is an ethnic group in the Central African Republic and Sudan. They speak Banda-Banda, a Niger-Congo language.

References

External links

Joshua Project

Ethnic groups in the Central African Republic
Ethnic groups in Sudan